KIDE is a radio station serving Hoopa, California, and the vicinity providing a community radio format and is affiliated with the Pacifica Radio Network. It broadcasts on 91.3 MHz and is under ownership of the Hoopa Valley Tribe. It is one of the few stations in the United States to be solar powered.뭔글임?

See also
List of community radio stations in the United States

External links
KIDE Radio

Native American radio
Hupa
Community radio stations in the United States
IDE